Kripamayee Kali Temple ( Kripamôyee Kali Môndir), commonly known as Joy Mitra Kalibari (Jôy Mitrô Kalibari ), is a Hindu temple dedicated to goddess Kali, located on the eastern banks of Hooghly river at Baranagar (in Greater Kolkata) in North 24 Parganas district, in the Indian state of West Bengal.

History 
The temple was built in 1848 by Jai Narayan Mitra, a famous zamindar and a devotee of Kali. Mitra bought 3 bighas plot from one Mr. James and founded the temple. The presiding deity of the temple is Kripamayee ("She who is merciful"), a form of Kali. It is a colossal nabaratna (nine-spired) temple with twelve shrines dedicated to Shiva, Kali's consort.

External links

References 

Kali temples
Religious organizations established in 1848
Hindu temples in Kolkata
1848 establishments in British India
Baranagar